Possum Grape is an unincorporated community in Jackson County, Arkansas, United States. The town was named in 1954. For nearly two decades, residents were split on whether the name should be "Possum" or "Grape". Eventually, after much conflict and turmoil, a compromise was reached and the town name officially became Possum Grape.

References

Unincorporated communities in Jackson County, Arkansas
Unincorporated communities in Arkansas